Tetrernia is a genus of moths of the family Crambidae.

Species
Tetrernia terminitis Meyrick, 1890
Tetrernia tetrommata Hampson, 1906

References

Natural History Museum Lepidoptera genus database

Acentropinae
Crambidae genera
Taxa named by Edward Meyrick